The 1998 Arab Cup Winners' Cup was the ninth edition of the Arab Cup Winners' Cup held in Beirut, Lebanon between 19 – 30 August 1998. The teams represented Arab nations from Africa and Asia.
MC Oran from Algeria won the final against Al-Jaish from Syria for consecutively the second time.

Qualifying round
Al-Nejmeh (the hosts) and MC Oran (the holders) qualified automatically.

Zone 1 (Gulf Area)

Al-Qadsia & Al-Wasl advanced to the final tournament.

Zone 2 (Red Sea)
Qualifying tournament held in Saudi Arabia. Al-Wehda Sana'a of Yemen withdrew from the tournament.

Al-Mourada & Al-Ta'ee advanced to the final tournament.

Zone 3 (North Africa)

Al-Nasr Benghazi advanced to the final tournament.

Zone 4 (East Region)
Qualifying tournament held in Beirut, Lebanon between 2 – 4 June 1998.

|-
!colspan=3|Day 1 

|-
!colspan=3|Day 2 

|-
!colspan=3|Day 3 

Al-Jaish advanced to the final tournament.

Group stage

Group A

Group B

Knock-out stage

Semi-finals

Final

Winners

References

External links
Arab Cup Winners' Cup 1998 – rsssf.com

1998
1998 in association football
International association football competitions hosted by Lebanon
1998 in Lebanese sport